The Sentinel Plain is an extensive northwest–southeast trending plain south of the Gila River Valley in southwestern Arizona, USA.

To the northeast is Painted Rock Reservoir and the Painted Rock Mountains. The south and southwest of the Sentinel Plain is bordered by the Crater Range; the east and southeast is bordered by the White Hills, and the Saucedo Mountains. Midway Wash drains into the center of the plain southeast-northwesterly, but disappears into the ground about 10 miles southeast from the Gila River. The west and southwestern border of the plain contains the northwest-flowing Tenmile Wash-(which also succumbs to ground disappearance, but adjacent to the Gila), and the northwest trending Crater Range.

See also
Sentinel Plain volcanic field

Plains of Arizona
Landforms of Maricopa County, Arizona
Landforms of Yuma County, Arizona